Aloysius Joseph Hodkey (November 3, 1917 – August 30, 2005) was a pitcher in Major League Baseball. He played for the Philadelphia Phillies.

References

External links

1917 births
2005 deaths
Major League Baseball pitchers
Philadelphia Phillies players
Baseball players from Ohio
Sportspeople from Lorain, Ohio
Sportspeople from Greater Cleveland